Terence Anthony Harris (27 August 1916 – 7 March 1993) was a South African cricketer who played in 3 Tests from 1947 to 1949. He also represented South Africa in five Rugby Union Tests during the 1930s.

References

External links

SA Rugby site

1916 births
1993 deaths
South Africa Test cricketers
South African cricketers
Gauteng cricketers
Griqualand West cricketers
South African rugby union players
South Africa international rugby union players
Cricketers from Kimberley, Northern Cape
Rugby union players from Kimberley, Northern Cape